Angela Margaret Leslie Thorne (born 25 January 1939) is an English actress of stage, television and film having performed roles in World in Ferment (1969), Get Some In! (1976), The Good Life (1977), Midsomer Murders, Foyle's War and Heartbeat, The BFG (1989) as the voice of the Queen, Three Up, Two Down and Lassie (2005).

However, she is probably best known for playing Marjory Frobisher in To the Manor Born (1979 -1981), and Margaret Thatcher in Anyone for Denis? (1982); Also for her 1981 Laurence Olivier Awards nomination for Best Comedy Performance for playing Margaret Thatcher in Anyone for Denis? at the Whitehall Theatre.

Early life
Angela Thorne was born in Karachi, British India, in 1939. The daughter of an Indian Army doctor father, William Herbert Alfred Thorne, and a teacher mother, Sylvia (Leslie), she spent the first five years of her life in India. She was later a pupil at Farlington School in Horsham, West Sussex. She trained for the stage at the Guildhall School of Music and Drama. Her marriage to television actor Peter Penry-Jones lasted from 22 September 1967 until his death in 2009. They had two sons, Laurence and Rupert, both actors.

In the BBC programme Who Do You Think You Are? featuring son Rupert, broadcast in August 2010, it was revealed that Thorne's father William had served with the Indian Medical Corps at the Battle of Monte Cassino and that his preceding ancestors had a long-standing connection with the Indian Army.

Acting career
Her first professional engagement was with the Caryl Jenner Children's Theatre. After repertory seasons at York and Sheffield, she appeared in Night Must Fall at Theatre Royal, Windsor. Thorne then joined the Ralph Richardson Theatre company at the Haymarket Theatre, and played Gloria in You Never Can Tell, Portia in the Merchant of Venice and Julia in The Rivals.

Other theatre work that Thorne partook in was in Little Boxes - Hampstead Theatre, She portrayed Io in Prometheus Bound at the Mermaid Theatre; Twelfth Night for the Prospect Theatre Company touring the east; Yahoo - Queen’s theatre, and many more productions around England.

Thorne received a nomination at the 1981 Laurence Olivier Awards for Best Comedy Performance for playing Margaret Thatcher in Anyone for Denis? at the Whitehall Theatre.

She also appeared in television productions, including Elizabeth R as Lettice Knollys, The Liars, and The Canterville Ghost, playing the leading role opposite Bruce Forsyth as the Ghost. She played the part of Margaret Thatcher in a television version the satirical, comic farce Anyone for Denis?, in 1982. 

In 1969 she starred as Nancy Chuff in the comedy series World in Ferment. In 1984 she played the role of Susan, "The Duchess" in a West End revival of Giles Cooper's play Happy Family, opposite Ian Ogilvy and Stephanie Beacham. In 1996 she starred in Alan Ayckbourn's Communicating Doors at the Savoy Theatre, London.

She appeared in two episodes of Thames Television's sitcom Get Some In! in 1976 as Mrs Fairfax, and in one episode of the BBC sitcom The Good Life in 1977 as Lady Truscott, before appearing as Marjory Frobisher in To the Manor Born between 1979 and 1981: her husband appeared in two of the later episodes. She reprised this role for both the 10-episode radio series in 1997 and the one-off 2007 Christmas Special on television. She followed this with a lead role in another sitcom, Three Up, Two Down. After To the Manor Born, she also played the eponymous character in the ITV sitcom Farrington of the F.O. written by Dick Sharples.

She appeared in an episode of Midsomer Murders as well as in Foyle's War and Heartbeat. In 1989, she voiced the role of Elizabeth II in The BFG, the film adaptation of Roald Dahl's book.

Filmography

References

External links

1939 births
Alumni of the Guildhall School of Music and Drama
English stage actresses
English television actresses
Living people
Actresses from Karachi
20th-century English actresses